

Exhibition

Regular season
Freshman goaltender Barbara Bilko appeared in two games. Both games were against nationally ranked Minnesota on January 9 and 10. In her first career appearance in net, she played over 33 minutes and made 26 saves. In both appearances, she totaled 43:21 in net with 38 saves and eight goals allowed.

Roster

Schedule

Player performances
As a freshman, Laura McIntosh led the Buckeyes in points with 39 and assists with 28. McIntosh never had more than one penalty called against her in a game. Her 39 points rank third all-time in the Buckeye records for freshman scoring, while her 28 assists are an OSU rookie record. In the WCHA, she ranked fifth in rookie scoring. In the NCAA, she ranked seventh in rookie scoring with 1.08 points per game. Thirty-four of her points (10g, 24a) came against WCHA opponents, which tied for eighth in the league. From November 29 to January 10, she had a seven-game point streak. On October 4, she recorded her first point by scoring the game winning goal in a 3-2 triumph over the Providence Friars. On October 10, the Buckeyes had their home opener, and McIntosh had two assists vs. Wisconsin. In a sweep of the Bemidji State Beavers, she assisted on three of five goals (Oct. 24–25). McIntosh had a point in 10 of 11 games between Nov. 29 – Jan. 24. On February 20, McIntosh recorded her first career hat trick with three goals in 6-5 loss to Minnesota State. Her season finished by assisting on a Buckeye goal in a 4-1 loss to Wisconsin on February 28.
In her freshman season, Natalie Spooner played in 30 games (she missed six games due to her commitments with Team Canada). Despite playing in only 30 games, Spooner scored 21 goals to lead the Buckeyes. She added nine assists for 30 points, which ranked third on the Buckeyes.

Postseason

WCHA Playoffs

Player stats

Skaters

Goaltenders

Awards and honors
Laura McIntosh, team's Most Valuable Freshman award (2008–09)
Laura McIntosh, Ohio State Scholar-Athlete (2008–09)
Laura McIntosh, WCHA Rookie of the Week honors (for the week of Nov. 1, 2008)
Kelly Wild, Ohio State Scholar-Athlete (2008–09)

References

External links
Official site

Ohio State
Ohio State Buckeyes women's ice hockey seasons
Ohio State Buckeyes
Ohio State Buckeyes